John Spinks may refer to:
 John Spinks (academic)
 John Spinks (musician)
 John Spinks (photographer)